Ricardo Antonio Jérez Figueroa (born 4 February 1986) is a Guatemalan professional footballer who plays as a goalkeeper for USL League One club Chattanooga Red Wolves and the Guatemala national team.

Club career
Jerez is the son of the also former national team goalkeeper Ricardo Jérez who played in the 1988 Olympics.

Jerez Jr. came through the youth ranks of local giants CSD Comunicaciones before joining Cobán Imperial and C.S.D. Municipal.

Rentistas (2008–2009)
On early August 2008, he was sent to Uruguay to participate in some tests with Peñarol, which he failed but he was able to stay in the country to play for Rentistas team which competed in the Uruguayan Segunda División. He made his debut on 13 September against local rivals Cerrito, match which his team lost 2–1, but he was able to save a penalty shot by Richard Requelme and was named man of the match. Later, in the third round of the tournament, he saved again a penalty now against Boston River.

Back to Guatemala (2009–2010)
He then returned to Guatemala in September 2009 to play for Deportivo Jalapa

In summer 2010 he joined Argentinian third division side Club Comunicaciones. He remained six months on the club and could not play due to problems with his documents.

Later, Jerez returned to Guatemala where he played for USAC in a campaign that saw them suffer relegation.

Deportivo Marquense (2011–2012)
He then was signed by Deportivo Marquense in mid-2011, where between the playoffs of the 2011 Apertura and the 2012 Clausura tournament has set a new CONCACAF club record with 941 consecutive minutes without allowing a goal, a streak put to an end by Eliseo Quintanilla of Municipal.

Alianza Petrolera (2013–2022)
Jerez joined Alianza Petrolera in January 2013, at the time being the only non-domestic player in the squad. He recorded a clean sheet in his first league match in Colombia, in a 1–0 win against La Equidad on 8 January 2013. Throughout his time at the club, he has been regarded as an important figure in the team's success. In October 2013, the club announced the extension of Jerez's contract, which would end after the 2016 season. He's the first player to have played at least 100 games in the top division with the club.

Chattanooga Red Wolves (2023–present)
Jérez signed with USL League One club Chattanooga Red Wolves on 10 January 2023.

International career
Jerez made his debut for Guatemala in a January 2006 friendly match against the United States. He has represented his country in 2 FIFA World Cup qualification processes and at the 2009 UNCAF Nations Cup.

In 2008, he was selected for the Guatemala U-23 squad to participate in the 2008 CONCACAF Men's Olympic Qualifying where they could not qualify for the 2008 Summer Olympics.

He played in all of his team's matches at the 2011 CONCACAF Gold Cup, and was the starting goalkeeper for Guatemala in 11 of Guatemala's 12 matches during the 2014 FIFA World Cup qualification.

Honours
Municipal
Liga Nacional de Guatemala: Apertura 2006

Career statistics

References

External links

1986 births
Living people
Sportspeople from Guatemala City
Association football goalkeepers
Guatemalan footballers
Guatemalan expatriate footballers
Guatemala international footballers
Categoría Primera A players
Comunicaciones F.C. players
C.S.D. Municipal players
Rentistas players
Alianza Petrolera players
Deportivo Cali footballers
Expatriate footballers in Uruguay
Expatriate footballers in Colombia
Guatemalan expatriate sportspeople in Uruguay
Guatemalan expatriate sportspeople in Colombia
2009 UNCAF Nations Cup players
2011 CONCACAF Gold Cup players
2014 Copa Centroamericana players
2015 CONCACAF Gold Cup players
Chattanooga Red Wolves SC players
Guatemalan expatriate sportspeople in the United States
Expatriate soccer players in the United States